Sunnam Rajaiah (8 August 1960 – 4 August 2020) was an Indian politician from Telangana.

Career
He was elected as a Member of Legislative Assembly of Andhra Pradesh in 1999, 2004 and 2014 as a CPI(M) candidate. In 2009 election he lost the seat to his opponent Kunja Satyavati by 6956 Votes.

Rajaiah died from COVID-19 on 4 August 2020, four days short of his 60th birthday during the COVID-19 pandemic in India.

See also
 Bhadrachalam (Lok Sabha constituency)

References

External References
 Details of Sunnam Rajaiah Affidavit submitted for 2004 Andhra Pradesh State Assembly Elections

1960 births
People from Telangana
Telugu people
People from Khammam district
2020 deaths
Communist Party of India (Marxist) politicians from Telangana
Telangana MLAs 2014–2018
Deaths from the COVID-19 pandemic in India
People from Bhadradri Kothagudem district